Michael Edward Fidler (born August 19, 1956) is an American former professional ice hockey player who played 271 games in the National Hockey League between 1976 and 1982.  He played for the Cleveland Barons, Minnesota North Stars, Hartford Whalers, and Chicago Black Hawks. As an amateur, Fidler played for the Boston University hockey team and Malden Catholic.

In international hockey, Mike Fidler represented the United States national team at the 1978 IIHF Ice Hockey World Championships tournament (where he was the team's top scorer). He was also a member of the U.S. team that participated in the 1983 Pool B tournament.

Career statistics

Regular season and playoffs

International

External links

Fidler's hockeydraftcentral profile

1956 births
Living people
American men's ice hockey left wingers
Boston University Terriers men's ice hockey players
California Golden Seals draft picks
Chicago Blackhawks players
Cleveland Barons (NHL) players
Erie Blades players
Hartford Whalers players
Ice hockey people from Boston
Malden Catholic High School alumni
Minnesota North Stars players
New England Whalers draft picks
New Haven Nighthawks players
Oklahoma City Stars players
Salt Lake Golden Eagles (CHL) players
Springfield Indians players
Wiener EV players